The Revista Cubana de Cirugía is a medical journal of surgery published in Spanish in Havana, Cuba. The journal is abstracted and indexed in Excerpta Medica, Index Medicus, and Biological Abstracts.

External links

  (in Spanish)

Surgery journals
Medicine in Cuba